Alex Christian Delton is an American college football quarterback who played for the TCU Horned Frogs.

Early years
Delton was born October 23, 1996 in Hays, Kansas, where he grew up to become a football and track & field star at Hays High School.  Playing quarterback for the Indians, Delton amassed over 6,700 total yards and 75 touchdowns in his high school career. He committed to play college football at Kansas State in February 2014.

College career

Kansas State

2015–2018 
After enrolling at Kansas State in 2015, Delton played in the Wildcats' first two games that fall before being injured and taking a redshirt season. He returned to action as a backup in 2016, and as a redshirt sophomore in 2017 earned the first four starts of his college career.  He came off the bench in the 2017 Cactus Bowl against UCLA, earning game MVP honors by rushing for 158 yards and three touchdowns en route to a 35-17 victory. He was named a team captain for his junior season in 2018, but made just two starts as the Wildcats failed to make a bowl game.

TCU

2019 
After initially deciding to transfer to join former Kansas State offensive coordinator Dana Dimel at UTEP, Delton changed his mind in January 2019 - instead enrolling at TCU, where he'll be eligible to play immediately as a graduate transfer. Delton was named starting quarterback for the 2019 TCU Horned Frogs.

References

External links
TCU Horned Frogs bio
Kansas State Wildcats bio

1996 births
Living people
American football quarterbacks
TCU Horned Frogs football players
Kansas State Wildcats football players
People from Hays, Kansas
Players of American football from Kansas